Pustosh is a rural locality (a village) in Safronovskoye Rural Settlement of Lensky District, Arkhangelsk Oblast, Russia. The population was 7 as of 2010.

Geography 
Pustosh is located 19 km southwest of Yarensk (the district's administrative centre) by road. Zapan Yarenga is the nearest rural locality.

References 

Rural localities in Lensky District, Arkhangelsk Oblast